Dasht-e Arzhan Rural District is a rural district (dehestan) in Arzhan District, Shiraz County, Fars Province, Iran. At the 2006 census, its population was 4,901, in 1,089 families.  The rural district has 14 villages.

See also 
 Dasht-e Arzhan
 The protected area of Arzhan and Parishan

References 

Rural Districts of Fars Province
Shiraz County